

Ælfwine (or Aelfwin) was an Anglo-Saxon Bishop of Wells. He was consecrated about 997, and died around 998.

Citations

References

External links
 

Bishops of Wells
990s deaths
Year of birth unknown
10th-century English bishops